Malacca Bee Gallery, formerly The World's Bees Museum, is a gallery about bees located at the Malacca Botanical Garden in Ayer Keroh, Malacca, Malaysia, which was established in 2013. It showcases around 250 type specimens of bee hives and hornet nests, and also the spectacular bee man show. The gallery has different sections, such as bee keeping, species of bees, bee habitat and traditional tools used for honey gathering.

It is operated by Giant B, the brand of the largest honey producer in Malaysia.  One may get tastes of, and purchase, numerous types of honey.

See also
 List of tourist attractions in Malacca

References

2013 establishments in Malaysia
Art museums and galleries in Melaka
Ayer Keroh
Buildings and structures completed in 2013
Museums in Malacca
Museums established in 2013
Buildings and structures in Malacca
Tourist attractions in Malacca
Bee museums